James Burrows (21 December 1886 - 17 August 1970) was a member of the Queensland Legislative Assembly.

Biography
Burrows was born at Eidsvold, Queensland, the son of Henry Burrows and his wife Laura Christine (née Brandis). He was educated at Gaeta, Mount Perry and Many Peaks state schools and then did an accountancy and Local Government Clerkship correspondence course with Hemingway Robertson Ltd. He did general bushwork before becoming and auditor and registered valuer.

In October 1940 Burrows married Bertha Maud Wilkinson and together had four sons. He died at Gladstone in October 1978.

Public life
Burrows, representing the Labor Party, won the seat of Port Curtis at the 1947 Queensland state election. He held it for the next sixteen years before retiring at the 1963 Queensland state election.

References

Members of the Queensland Legislative Assembly
1886 births
1978 deaths
Australian Labor Party members of the Parliament of Queensland
20th-century Australian politicians